David Roditi Jiménez (born November 30, 1973) is a tennis coach and former player from Mexico. He is currently serving as the head men's tennis coach at Texas Christian University, his alma mater. 

Born in Mexico City, Roditi grew up in Guadalajara and Manzanillo, then moved to the United States as a teenager; he attended high school in San Clemente, California. 

Roditi participated in 10 Davis Cup ties for Mexico from 1997 to 2000, posting a 5–5 record in doubles. He was also Mexico's Davis Cup captain in 2016.

Playing career
Roditi played at Texas Christian University from 1993 to 1996 under  head coach Tut Bartzen. During this time, playing both singles and doubles, he won a school-record 250 total matches. He earned All-Southwest Conference honors in both singles and doubles in 1994, 1995 and 1996 and was named to the Rolex Collegiate All-Star team in 1996. He was named to the Letterman's Hall of Fame for Texas Christian University in 2007.

As a professional, Roditi focused mostly on doubles competition, in which he achieved a career-high world ranking of 41 in 1998 and made the finals in four events:

Coaching career
Following the conclusion of his professional playing career, Roditi moved to Austin, Texas in 2000 to become an assistant coach at the University of Texas and then as the Associate Director of Tennis at St. Stephen's Episcopal School.  In 2005, he moved to Carson, California to become the Lead National Team Coach at the USTA Training Center.

On September 7, 2010, Roditi was named the head men's tennis coach at TCU.

Head coaching record

References

External links
 
 
 

Mexican male tennis players
Mexican people of Italian descent
Tennis players from Mexico City
Living people
1973 births
TCU Horned Frogs men's tennis players